Unified Parallel C (UPC) is an extension of the C programming language designed for high-performance computing on large-scale parallel machines, including those with a common global address space (SMP and NUMA) and those with distributed memory (e. g. clusters). The programmer is presented with a single partitioned global address space; where shared variables may be directly read and written by any processor, but each variable is physically associated with a single processor. UPC uses a single program, multiple data (SPMD) model of computation in which the amount of parallelism is fixed at program startup time, typically with a single thread of execution per processor.

In order to express parallelism, UPC extends ISO C 99 with the following constructs:

 An explicitly parallel execution model
 A shared address space ( storage qualifier) with thread-local parts (normal variables)
 Synchronization primitives and a memory consistency model
 Explicit communication primitives, e. g. upc_memput
 Memory management primitives

The UPC language evolved from experiences with three other earlier languages that proposed parallel extensions to ISO C 99: AC, Split-C, and Parallel C preprocessor (PCP). UPC is not a superset of these three languages, but rather an attempt to distill the best characteristics of each. UPC combines the programmability advantages of the shared memory programming paradigm and the control over data layout and performance of the message passing programming paradigm.

See also 
 Cilk
 Coarray Fortran
 Chapel
 X10
 High Performance Fortran
 OpenMP
 Partitioned global address space
 Parallel programming model
 Software transactional memory

External links 
 
 UPC at LBNL
 UPC at GWU
 GNU UPC
 UPC Tutorial (2003)

Concurrent programming languages
Parallel computing
C programming language family